Sainsbury's Local (a trading name of Sainsbury's Supermarkets Ltd) is a chain of 770 convenience shops operated by the UK's second largest supermarket chain Sainsbury's.

History

In 1998, Sainsbury's piloted its first Local shop in Hammersmith. The shop opened on the busy Fulham Palace Road and was designed for the convenience of customers who did not have time to do a full weekly food shop. Research showed that people were working longer hours and more women were in employment than ever before. Customers needed to spend less time on chores such as shopping, so local ‘top-up’ shopping was an ideal solution.  As well as a large range of ready meals, wines and desserts designed for people on-the-go, the branch also offered hot drinks and freshly baked goods, alongside Sainsbury's best-selling products.  The Hammersmith shop also had a cash machine and was open until midnight most days of the week.

Sainsbury's Local shop was also ground-breaking in terms of staff training. In most Sainsbury's shops, colleagues were trained for specific departments (e.g. checkouts, café, fresh foods, GM). The small size of Sainsbury's Local shops meant that staff needed a high level of product knowledge across all departments. Keeping in line with the ‘Local’ concept, the Hammersmith shop also employed only local people.

On 12 November 2008 Sainsbury's announced that 50 convenience shops would open in the 2009/10 financial year, and a further 100 the following year.

Joint venture with Shell
In June 2003, Sainsbury's announced that it was creating 100 new convenience shops at Shell petrol stations. The shops were to open over the next three years, leading to the creation of up to 2,000 jobs.

The first of the shops opened in the autumn of that year, following a successful trial at six garages in the south-east of England. The new shops were based on the existing "Sainsbury Local" outlets, but also sold car care products and motor accessories.

In the end, only 24 shops were opened.

Acquisitions
Following rival Tesco’s purchase of the convenience shop chain T&S Stores in 2002 and the subsequent conversion of 450 of the 870 T&S shops into its Tesco Express convenience shops, Sainsbury’s announced the acquisition of a number of convenience shop chains:

Bells Stores
In February 2004, Sainsbury’s announced it was to buy Bells Stores in the North East of England for around £22m. Bells Stores operated 54 neighbourhood shops, and was owned and run by the Bell family. The shops were initially refurbished to trade as ‘Sainsbury’s at Bells’.

Jacksons Stores
In August 2004 Sainsbury's further increased its presence in the convenience shop sector, by acquiring Jacksons Stores for £78m from the family food business William Jackson & Son Ltd, owned by the Oughtred family. Jacksons Stores had 114 shops in the Yorkshire area and the North Midlands, and just before the Sainsbury's acquisition, was voted the UK's best independent convenience shop chain. The acquisition doubled Sainsbury's market share in the convenience shop sector to 2%. The shops were initially refurbished to trade as ‘Sainsbury’s at Jacksons’.

J B Beaumont
In November 2004, Sainsbury's acquired JB Beaumont, a convenience chain owned and run by the Beaumont family and which was then number 48 in the Grocer Top 50. The company first began trading as a butcher in Kirkby-in-Ashfield (Nottinghamshire) in 1902. The six JB Beaumont shops were located in Cotgrave; Bingham; Keyworth; Long Eaton; Chilwell and Gedling. The shops were initially refurbished to trade as ‘Sainsbury’s at Beaumonts’.

S L Shaw
In April 2005, Sainsbury's acquired SL Shaw Ltd, a neighbourhood convenience shop operator with five shops in the south-east of England. After a programme of refurbishment, the five shops converted to the Sainsbury's Local format, combining Shaw's reputation and customer service with Sainsbury's expertise in fresh and convenience foods.

Branding
Sainsbury's initially retained the strong Bells and Jacksons brands. For example, refurbished shops were called Sainsbury's at Bells or Sainsbury's at Jacksons. These were effectively Sainsbury's Local shops with a revised fascia, retaining some features of the former local chain. Unrefurbished shops retained the original brand and logo, but still offered Sainsbury's own brand products, pricing and some point of sale, without accepting Nectar cards. The old websites were also retained with some of Sainsbury's branding.

This was an experimental format and on 4 May 2007 it was announced that all shops would be rebranded as Sainsbury's Local, with the management teams of the smaller shops integrated into Sainsbury's own teams.

Sainsbury's Central

A second convenience format, Sainsbury's Central, was announced in 1999 for small to mid-sized shops in town centres and commuter areas, similar to Tesco's 'Tesco Metro' format which launched in 1993. Central shops had an offer dominated by convenience foods, but also carried selected ranges from the full Sainsbury's range. These were later rebranded as Sainsbury's stores.

See also

Sainsbury's
Bells Stores
Jacksons Stores

References

External links
J Sainsbury plc
Sainsbury's

Sainsbury's
Convenience stores of the United Kingdom